The 2022 Verizon 200 at the Brickyard was a NASCAR Cup Series race held on July 31, 2022, at Indianapolis Motor Speedway in Speedway, Indiana. It was the 2nd running of the Verizon 200 at the Brickyard on the road course, and officially the 29th edition of NASCAR at the speedway. Contested over 86 laps – extended from 82 laps due to an overtime finish, on the  road course, it was the 22nd race of the 2022 NASCAR Cup Series season.

Report

Background

The Indianapolis Motor Speedway, located in Speedway, Indiana, (an enclave suburb of Indianapolis) in the United States, is the home of the Indianapolis 500 and the Brickyard 400.

Constructed in 1909, it is the original speedway, the first racing facility so named. It has a permanent seating capacity estimated at 235,000 with infield seating raising capacity to an approximate 400,000. It is the highest-capacity sports venue in the world.

This will be the first official qualifying and race weekend in the Cup Series for Daniil Kvyat and also for Ty Gibbs.  Gibbs made his Cup Series debut at Pocono following a medical disqualification of Kurt Busch, who remains under suspension by NASCAR as a result of concussion protocol following his Q2 crash at Pocono the previous week.

Entry list
 (R) denotes rookie driver.
 (i) denotes driver who is ineligible for series driver points.

Practice

Practice results

Qualifying

Qualifying results

Race

Stage Results

Stage One
Laps: 15

Stage Two
Laps: 20

Final Stage Results

Stage Three
Laps: 47

Race statistics
 Lead changes: 9 among 7 different drivers
 Cautions/Laps: 5 for 15
 Red flags: 0
 Time of race: 2 hours, 40 minutes and 18 seconds
 Average speed:

Media

Television
NBC Sports covered the race on the television side. Rick Allen, Jeff Burton, Steve Letarte, and Dale Earnhardt Jr. called the race from the broadcast booth. Dave Burns, Parker Kligerman, and Marty Snider handled the pit road duties from pit lane. Rutledge Wood served as a “CityView” reporter and share stories from the track.

Radio
Indianapolis Motor Speedway Radio Network and the Performance Racing Network jointly co-produce the radio broadcast for the race, which was simulcast on Sirius XM NASCAR Radio, and aired on IMS or PRN stations, depending on contractual obligations. The lead announcers and two pit reporters were PRN staff, while the turns announcers and two pit reporters were from IMS.

Standings after the race

Drivers' Championship standings

Manufacturers' Championship standings

Note: Only the first 16 positions are included for the driver standings.
. – Driver has clinched a position in the NASCAR Cup Series playoffs.

Notes

References

2022 Verizon 200 at the Brickyard
Verizon 200 at the Brickyard
Verizon 200 at the Brickyard
Verizon 200 at the Brickyard